Fallentimber is an unincorporated community in Cambria County, Pennsylvania, United States. Its ZIP code is 16639.

History
A post office called Fallentimber has been in operation since 1850. Fallentimber was named for the fact a storm flattened trees near the original town site.

References

Unincorporated communities in Cambria County, Pennsylvania
Unincorporated communities in Pennsylvania